Jingneta is a genus of east Asian leptonetids. It was first described by C. X. Wang, S. Q. Li and Ming-Sheng Zhu in 2020, and it has only been found in China. The type species, Jingneta cornea, was originally described under the name "Leptoneta cornea".

Species
 it contains nine species:
J. caoxian Wang & Li, 2020 – China
J. cornea (Tong & Li, 2008) (type) – China
J. exilocula (Tong & Li, 2008) – China
J. foliiformis (Tong & Li, 2008) – China
J. jingdong Wang & Li, 2020 – China
J. maculosa (Song & Xu, 1986) – China
J. setulifera (Tong & Li, 2008) – China
J. tunxiensis (Song & Xu, 1986) – China
J. wangae (Tong & Li, 2008) – China

See also
 Leptoneta
 List of Leptonetidae species

References

Further reading

Leptonetidae genera
Spiders of China